Francesco Marino, better known as Marino Di Teana (August 8, 1920 – January 1, 2012) was an Italian Argentine sculptor.

History
He emigrated to Argentina, working as a bricklayer at the age of 16 and became a construction site manager at 22. At the same time, he studied at the Salguero Polytechnic at the Architectural National School. He entered the Higher National School of Fine Arts Ernesto de la Carcova in Buenos Aires via an entrance competition and graduated with the title of Higher Professor and obtained a professorship at that school. He won the Premio Mittre, equivalent to the European Grand Prix de Rome.

References

1920 births
2012 deaths
Italian emigrants to Argentina
20th-century Italian sculptors
20th-century Italian male artists
Italian male sculptors
21st-century sculptors
People from the Province of Potenza
Argentine contemporary artists
Italian contemporary artists